Mystical Seven may refer to:

 Mystical Seven (Wesleyan) - an intercollegiate fraternity founded in 1837 at Wesleyan University
 Mystical Seven (Missouri) - a secret society established in 1907 at the University of Missouri

See also
 Seven Society (University of Virginia), a secret society established in 1905 at the University of Virginia
 Seven Society (College of William & Mary), a secret society established in 1826 at the College of William & Mary